Sudhir Patwardhan is an Indian contemporary painter and a practising radiologist.

Early life

Patwardhan was born in Pune, Maharashtra in 1949.
In 1972 he graduated in Medicine from the Armed Forces Medical College, Pune. He moved to Mumbai in 1973 and worked as a radiologist in Thane from 1975 to 2005.

Career

After 2005 he became a full-time artist. The city-scape features prominently in his canvases, and reflect the agonies of the urban middle class and poor. Patwardhan’s works are in the permanent collection of National Gallery of Modern Art, New Delhi and Mumbai; Roopankar Museum, Bhopal; Kiran Nadar Museum of Art, New Delhi, Jehangir Nicholson Art Foundation, Mumbai; the Peabody Essex Museum, Salem, Massachusetts and other prominent private and public collections.

Select Exhibitions (National and International)

 'Aspects of Modem Indian Art' Oxford, U.K. 1982
Contemporary Indian Art, festival of India, London, 1982
 Seven Indian Artists, Hamburg, West Germany, 1982
 Contemporary Indian Art, Festival of India, New York, 1985
 Festival of India, Center George Pompidou, Paris 1986 
 'Coupe de Coeur' Geneva, 1987
  'Gadyaparva Exhibition' Gallery Chemould, Mumbai (1990), 'Parallel Perceptions', Sakshi Gallery, Mumbai (1993)
 'Contemporary Indian Painting from the Herwitz Family Collection Part I, auction by Sotheby's, New York, USA (1995, 96)
 'Contemporary Indian Painters 96' Jehangir Art Gallery, Mumbai 1996)
 'Charcoal & Conte' Birla Century Art Gallery, Mumbai (1997), Icons of the Millennium (Lakeeren Art Gallery), Mumbai
 'Extreme Gourmet' Indigo, Lakeeren, Mumbai and Century City, Tate Modern, London, UK (2001)

External links

References

Indian male painters
1949 births
Living people
Artists from Pune
20th-century Indian painters
Painters from Maharashtra
Indian radiologists
Artists from Mumbai
20th-century Indian male artists